Renato Scrollavezza (14 April 1927 – 14 October 2019) was an Italian luthier.
His daughter Elisa is continuing today the family activity.

References

1927 births
2019 deaths
Italian luthiers
People from Parma